ISO 3166-2:AN was the entry for the Netherlands Antilles in ISO 3166-2, part of the ISO 3166 standard published by the International Organization for Standardization (ISO), which defines codes for the names of the principal subdivisions (e.g., provinces or states) of all countries coded in ISO 3166-1.

The Netherlands Antilles were officially assigned the ISO 3166-1 alpha-2 code  before it was dissolved into five separate territories in 2010, and the entry has been deleted from ISO 3166-1 as a result. Curaçao and Sint Maarten, which became "countries" in the Kingdom of the Netherlands, are now assigned the ISO 3166-1 alpha-2 codes  and  respectively. Bonaire, Sint Eustatius, and Saba, which became "special municipalities" of the Netherlands, are now assigned the ISO 3166-1 alpha-2 code  under the collective entry "Bonaire, Sint Eustatius and Saba".

No ISO 3166-2 codes were ever defined in the entry for the Netherlands Antilles.

Changes
The following changes to the entry had been announced in newsletters by the ISO 3166/MA since the first publication of ISO 3166-2 in 1998:

See also
 Subdivisions of the Netherlands Antilles

External links
 ISO Online Browsing Platform: AN
 Netherlands Antilles, Statoids.com

2:AN
Geography of the Netherlands Antilles